State Highway 9 (SH-9) is a  state highway in Latah County, Idaho, United States. It connects SH-8 just west of Deary with SH-6 near Harvard.

Route description

SH-9 begins just west of Deary at an intersection with SH-8, which continues toward Moscow and Helmer. The highway travels north-northwesterly through rural areas along the eastern edge of the Palouse Range for its entire course, generally following a former railroad last used by the BNSF Railway. SH-9 passes south of Avon and through Stanford before reaching the Palouse River near its northern terminus at SH-6 just west of Harvard. SH-6 continues onward to Potlatch and Saint Joe National Forest from the intersection.

History
The Lewis and Clark Highway, from Lewiston eastward to Lolo Pass, was designated State Highway 9 in 1916 and construction began in 1920. Upon its completion in 1962, it became U.S. Route 12.

SH-9 was the last state highway in Idaho to be paved (though, as of 2012, Idaho State Highway 29 and Idaho State Highway 64 still have unpaved sections).

Major intersections

See also

 List of state highways in Idaho

References

External links

 

009
Transportation in Latah County, Idaho